Mimenicodes opacoides is a species of beetle in the family Cerambycidae. It was described by Stephan von Breuning in 1982. It is known from New Caledonia.

References

Enicodini
Beetles described in 1982